The Bidadari Resolutions were set of resolutions adopted by the nascent Indian National Army in April 1942 that declared the formation of the INA and its aim to launch an armed struggle for Indian independence. The resolution was declared at a prisoner-of-war camp at the Bidadari (Bidadri PoW camp) in Singapore during Japanese occupation of the island.

Fall of Singapore

The fall of Singapore on 15 February 1942 brought under the Japanese occupation approximately 45,000 Indian PoWs. The surrender of these PoWs were accepted by Major Fujiwara Iwaichi, separately from that of British PoWs, on the morning of 17th at Farrer Park Field. Fujiwara passed on their command to Mohan Singh, who had formulated the conception of a liberation army for India's Independence, accepted their command and invited the PoWs to join his proposed army. A large number of the troops volunteered.
Following this, the plans to formally establish the Indian National Army as the armed unit of the Indian Independence League were started. However, officers within the Indian Pow sought to establish clearly the Japanese intentions and designs for the army and clarification of its goals.

Bidadary resolution

In April 1942, even as the discussions and the process of setting up the Indian Independence League and defining the aims of the movement carried on,  Mohan Singh convened a meeting of a group of his officers to frame what has now come to be known as the Bidadary resolution. The resolution, declared by Mohan Singh Deb, announced that: 
The resolution further specified that the army would go to battle only when the Congress and the people of India asked it to. It did not however, specify the how army was to interact with the Japanese forces.

Effects of the resolution

Following the Bidadari resolutions, the Indian PoW camps were dissolved and the staff were transferred to the INA supreme command under Mohan Singh. On 9 May, recruiting for the INA began. Mohan Singh had copies of the resolution circulated among the Indian jawans, followed by tours of the mainland camps by Mohan Singh and Fujiwara to encourage the troops to join the INA. In June, a conference was held in Bangkok that saw the proclamation of the Indian Independence League and clearly established the relationship between the INA and the Japanese army and established the IIL as the master organisation of which the INA was to be the armed wing of. The Bidadary resolutions therefore formed the basis on which the subsequent organisations and orders of the first INA was built.

See also 

 Indian National Army in Singapore

 INA related context 
 1915 Singapore Mutiny
 First Indian National Army
 Royal Indian Navy mutiny
 Royal Air Force mutiny 
 History of Singapore

 General context 
 1915 Singapore Mutiny
 Greater India
 History of Indian influence on Southeast Asia
 History of Singaporean Indians
 Hinduism in South East Asia
 Indian diaspora
 Indianisation
 Indian Singaporeans
 List of Hindu temples in Singapore
 List of Indian organisations in Singapore

References

Notes

Citations 
 .
.

Indian independence movement
Indian National Army
South-East Asian theatre of World War II
Indian Independence League
1942 in India
1942 documents
India in World War II